Neotelphusa bimaculata is a moth of the family Gelechiidae. It is found in Namibia.

References

Moths described in 1958
Neotelphusa